Lea Aini (born 1962 Tel Aviv), is an Israeli author and poet, who has written over twenty books.

Her 2009 novel The Rose of Lebanon, her eighth prose book, deals with the stories that a female soldier volunteer tells about her childhood as the daughter of a Holocaust survivor from Saloniki.

Awards
In 1988, Eini won the Wertheim Prize for Poetry and the Adler Prize for Poetry.
In 1993, she was awarded the Prime Minister's award for Hebrew Literature, which she received again in 2003.
In 1994, she received the Tel Aviv Foundation Award.
In 2006, she received the Bernstein Prize (original Hebrew language play category).
In 2010, she was awarded the Bialik Prize for literature, (jointly with Shlomit Cohen-Assif and Mordechai Geldman).

Books Published in Hebrew

Poetry
Diokan ("Portrait"), Hakibbutz Hameuchad, 1988 
Keisarit Ha-Pirion Ha-Medumeh ("The Empress of Imagined Fertility"), Hakibbutz Hameuchad/Siman Kriah, 1991

Short fiction
Giborei Kayits ("The Sea Horse Race" - stories & novella), Hakibbutz Hameuchad/Siman Kriah, 1991
Hardufim, O Sipurim Mur`alim Al Ahava ("Oleanders or Poisoned Love Stories" - stories) Zmora Bitan, 1997 
Sdommel (novella & two stories), Hakibbutz Hameuchad/Siman Kriah, 2001

Novels
Geut Ha-Hol ("Sand Tide"), Hakibbutz Hameuchad/Siman Kriah, 1992 
Mishehi Tzricha Lihiot Kan ("Someone Must Be Here"), Hakibbutz Hameuchad/Siman Kriah, 1995 
Ashtoret ("Astarte"), Zmora Bitan, 1999 
Anak, Malka ve-Aman Hamiskhakim ("Giant, Queen, and the Master of Games"), Hakibbutz Hameuchad, 2004 
Vered Ha-Levanon ("Rose of Lebanon"), Kinneret, Zmora-Bitan, 2009 
Susit ("Horsey"), Kinneret, Zmora-Bitan, 2012
Bat ha-Makom ("The Native" - novel & novella), Kinneret, Zmora-Bitan, 2014

Youth titles
Tikrah Li Mi-Lemata ("Call Me from Downstairs"), Hakibbutz Hameuchad, 1994 
Hei, Yuli ("Hi, Yuli"), Hakibbutz Hameuchad, 1995

Children's titles
Mar Arnav Mehapes Avoda ("Mr. Rabbit's Job Hunt"), Am Oved, 1994 
Hetzi Ve-Ananas: Tamnunina ("Half-Pint and Wandercloud: Octopina"), Hakibbutz Hameuchad, 1996 
Shir Ani, Shir Eema ("One Song Me, One Song Mummy"), Hakibbutz Hameuchad, 2000 
Kuku Petrozilia ("Parsley Ponytail"), Kinneret, 2002

See also
List of Bialik Prize recipients

References

External links
"Not only spiritual leaders, but also the moon can teach Bible." Poetry International Centre, May 2, 2005

1962 births
Living people
Israeli Jews
Israeli novelists
20th-century Israeli poets
Bernstein Prize recipients
Hebrew-language poets
Israeli women novelists
Israeli women poets
20th-century women writers
Recipients of Prime Minister's Prize for Hebrew Literary Works
Jewish women writers